Joe W. Davis Stadium is a minor league baseball park in Huntsville, Alabama, United States, which hosted the Huntsville Stars of the Southern League from 1985 until 2014, and then served as a temporary home for the Stars' successor (the Biloxi Shuckers) in 2015. The stadium is currently undergoing renovations that will see it serve as the home to Nashville SC's MLS Next Pro team.

Built in 1985, the stadium is located on the grounds of Huntsville's former airport, adjacent to Huntsville's main north–south thoroughfare, U.S. Highway 231 (S. Memorial Parkway). The stadium is a multi-purpose facility that seats 10,488 with 15 air-conditioned skyboxes. Ticket offices and the general office are located on the second floor of the stadium. Closed circuit television above the main concourse allows for viewing of the game while grabbing a bite at the concession stands. In addition to baseball, Joe W. Davis Stadium has been used for high school football, monster truck rallies, and concerts.

Nicknamed "The Crown Jewel of the Southern League" upon its construction, the stadium was the oldest venue in the league during its final year of operation. This was not due to planned obsolescence, but to the fact that all the League's other teams had built new parks since 1985, especially in the 1990s, during a craze prompted by the critically acclaimed Oriole Park at Camden Yards, occupied by the Baltimore Orioles.

History
The stadium is named for the longtime mayor of Huntsville, Joe W. Davis, who was instrumental in the city's efforts to construct the stadium. Construction came about in 1984 after Nashville Sounds owner Larry Schmittou purchased the Evansville Triplets with the intent of moving the team in 1985 to Nashville, Tennessee to effectively elevate his Double-A Sounds to the Triple-A level. As a result of this move, the existing Double-A franchise would need a new home. Schmittou considered a swap that would have sent the Double-A team to Evansville, Indiana to replace the Triplets. Evansville city leaders, though, balked at the requested stadium upgrades, leading Schmittou to seek alternate arrangements, which resulted in him moving the franchise to Huntsville, only some 100 miles away from Nashville. The team became known as the Huntsville Stars, and Schmittou continued to own the franchise until selling it to a local ownership group in 1994.

The first game was held on April 19, 1985. The Stars defeated the Birmingham Barons 10–0 in a game that included a grand slam from future major-leaguer Jose Canseco.

On July 10, 1991, the ballpark hosted the first Double-A All-Star Game. A team of American League-affiliated All-Stars defeated a team of National League-affiliated All-Stars, 8–2, before 4,022 people in attendance.

In the mid-2000s, with the stadium approaching two decades in service, renovations began on the stadium, including the replacement of all the stadium's box seats. In 2004, Joe Davis Stadium's current scoreboard, a 36-by-48-foot scoreboard complete with LED numbering and a 12-by-18-foot videoboard, was installed.

In 2014, the Stars were sold to an ownership group with the intent of relocating the franchise to Biloxi, Mississippi at the end of the season. The sale followed years of failed attempts to secure a new ballpark for the team in Huntsville. However, due to construction delays preventing the new Biloxi stadium from being completed in time for the Southern League's 2015 opening day, and because the franchise was still operating under a lease to use Joe Davis Stadium, the newly christened Biloxi Shuckers was forced to play 15 of its first 25 scheduled home games in Huntsville, with attendance often in the triple digits only, and sometimes lower than that, as most locals had no interest at all in watching their former beloved home team play a makeshift, lame-duck season. (The remaining ten home games were played with Biloxi acting as the home team on its opponents' home fields.)

The final game at Joe Davis Stadium was played on May 25, 2015 – a 7-2 rain-shortened win for the Shuckers over the Barons, marking an end to 31 seasons of minor league baseball in Huntsville. As things turned out, happily for local fans, it would be only a five-year interregnum between the Stars'/Shuckers' departure and the arrival of another Southern League team in North Alabama, the former Mobile BayBears, which played at the opposite end of the state. The BayBears, under new ownership, took the name Rocket City Trash Pandas and began play at the newly constructed Toyota Field in Madison, west of Huntsville along Interstate 565, in 2021. The Trash Pandas were set to begin play in 2020, but had to cancel the season, in concord with the rest of minor league baseball that year, due to the COVID-19 pandemic. The Southern League was reorganized in 2021 as Double-A South, a placeholder name.

Soon after the last Stars/Shuckers game, the Huntsville city administrator said that the stadium would be razed later in 2015, but its fate was still being debated in May 2018.

In November 2019, the City of Huntsville began implementing plans to renovate the stadium into a multi-use facility, awarding an architectural contract for the design and construction documents needed to put the project out for bid.

On July 12, 2022, it was announced that upon completion of renovations, the stadium will host the MLS Next Pro affiliate team for Major League Soccer's Nashville SC. On November 9, 2022, the name of the team was announced as Huntsville City FC.

Field diagram

References

External links
 Stadium Page at Huntsvillestars.com
 Joe W. Davis Municipal Stadium Views - Ball Parks of the Minor Leagues
 Alabama-Huntsville Chargers Profile

Minor league baseball venues
Sports venues in Huntsville, Alabama
High school football venues in the United States
Huntsville-Decatur, AL Combined Statistical Area
Landmarks in Alabama
Baseball venues in Alabama
1985 establishments in Alabama
Sports venues completed in 1985
College baseball venues in the United States
Soccer venues in Alabama